The Egyptian Socialist Party was a political party in Egypt founded in 1921. The party included both Marxist, Anarchist and Reformist elements. The party platform was published on August 29, 1921. The party began publishing the newspaper ash-Shebiba (الشبيبة). The party established a network of local branches in major cities around the country. It initiated work amongst trade unions and took part in organizing strikes. It also began educational activities for children of workers as well as trying to reach out to mobilize the peasantry.

A party conference held in July 1922 declared the Alexandria branch of the party as the party headquarters. On October 20, 1922, the party declared itself as the true representative of the Egyptian working class. Towards the end of the year the party counted with around 1,500 members (400 in Alexandria).

The party sent Hosni al-Arabi to Moscow, to negotiate a possible entry of the party to the Communist International. Al-Arabi returned to Egypt towards the end of 1921, with the instructions that the party would adhere to the twenty-one conditions of the Communist International. A majority of the party Central Committee (led by al-Arabi) approved the conditions in December 1922, and the name of the party was changed to Egyptian Communist Party. The party treasurer Rosenthal, who had opposed some of the conditions, was expelled and substituted by Ahmed al-Madani.

In 1923 the party was active in major strike actions. The British authorities clamped down on the party. Many party cadres were arrested and party offices were closed. Anton Maroun, a prominent leader of the party, died in jail. Subsequently, the colonial authorities sponsored yellow trade unions to counter the socialists.

After the crackdown on the party, Marxist sectors continued to operate in cells.

See also
Communist Party

References

Sources

1921 establishments in Egypt
1923 disestablishments in Egypt
Political parties established in 1921
Political parties disestablished in 1923
Comintern sections
Defunct communist parties in Egypt